Calakmul is a municipality in the Mexican state of Campeche, situated in the central part of the Yucatán Peninsula.

History
The municipality was created on 31 December 1996, from part of the territory of Champotón. On 19 June 1998, the State Congress enacted legislation creating the new municipality of Candelaria as of 1 July of that year, and Calakmul lost 24% of its population and a portion of its territory.

Geography
The municipality of Calakmul borders to the east with Quintana Roo (municipalities of José María Morelos, Bacalar, and Othón P. Blanco) and Belize (Orange Walk District); to the south with Guatemala (Petén Department); and to the north and west with other municipalities in Campeche (Candelaria, Champotón, Escárcega and Hopelchén). It covers 13,839.11 km² (5,343.31 sq mi), accounting for 24.34% of the state's total surface area, and is the 10th-largest municipality in area in the country.

Demographics
The 2010 census reported a population of 26,882 persons. The languages spoken in Calakmul include Yucatec Maya, Ch'ol, Chontal, Tzotzil, and others. The municipal seat is the town of Xpujil, a small settlement of 3,984 inhabitants located on Federal Highway 186 as it crosses the base of the peninsula from Escárcega, Campeche, to Chetumal, Quintana Roo.

Towns and villages
The largest localities (cities, towns, and villages) are:

Heritage
Maya archaeological sites in the municipality include: Calakmul, Becán, Chicanna, El Hormiguero, Río Bec and Xpuhil. The Calakmul Biosphere Reserve also covers much of its southern portion.

References

Link to tables of population data from Census of 2005 INEGI: Instituto Nacional de Estadística, Geografía e Informática
Calakmul Enciclopedia de los Municipios de México

External links
Ayuntamiento de Calakmul Official website 
Municipio de Calakmul from official Campeche state government website 

Municipalities of Campeche